The Landwasser Viaduct is a single-track six-arched curved limestone railway viaduct. It spans the Landwasser between Schmitten and Filisur, in the canton of Graubünden, Switzerland.

Designed by Alexander Acatos, the Landwasser Viaduct was constructed between 1901 and 1902 by Müller & Zeerleder on behalf of the Rhaetian Railway, which both owns and operates it through to the present day. During 2009, the Landwasser Viaduct underwent renovation work for the first time since its original construction.

Location

The Landwasser Viaduct, composed of dark limestone, forms part of the Albula Railway section between Tiefencastel and Filisur, and is at the  mark from Thusis.

To passengers on trains approaching the viaduct from Tiefencastel and Alvaneu on the Albula Railway, the viaduct becomes visible from quite some distance away. The first major feature to be reached on that approach is the Schmittentobel Viaduct, which itself is of considerable size.  Then, while crossing the curved Landwasser Viaduct, passengers can observe the front of the train heading into the Landwasser Tunnel. On the other side of the tunnel, the separate line from Davos Platz forms a junction with the Albula Railway just as both lines arrive in Filisur. Shortly before reaching that junction point, passengers on the Davos–Filisur line can experience a view of the viaduct from the northeast.

Technical details
It comprises six arch spans,  in width, resting on five high pillars; the arches themselves are flat.

The Landwasser Viaduct carries a single railway track, which has a gradient of 2 percent across the structure. The tunnel's entrance is positioned on a vertical rock wall, having been purposefully aligned with the viaduct. It was considered to be a challenging architectural feat of its era, and its construction employed several innovative techniques.

Construction of the Landwasser Viaduct commenced during 1901 and was completed during the following year. Designed by Alexander Acatos for the Rhaetian Railway, its construction was undertaken by Müller & Zeerleder. The viaduct's construction was performed without the use of scaffolding, instead employing two cranes. The limestone pillars were built up around a steel-reinforced core. During 2009, 106 years after its completion, the masonry and track trough of the viaduct were repaired for the very first time. To facilitate this renovation, modular scaffolding was temporarily erected around the Landwasser Viaduct.

In popular culture
The Landwasser Viaduct briefly appears as a bridge which was destroyed by Rasputin's minions in the 1997 animated film Anastasia. The portrayal was of a taller, 4-storey viaduct very similar to a Roman aqueduct but set in Poland. It also appears within the first couple of minutes of the film “A Cure for Wellness”.  Since 2008, the cultural importance of the railway, and features such as Landwasser Viaduct, has been formally recognised by UNESCO, having been placed on a World Heritage list.

Gallery

See also

Albula Railway
Arch bridge
Bernina Express
Filisur (Rhaetian Railway station)
Glacier Express
Rhaetian Railway
Schmitten, Graubünden
Schmittentobel Viaduct

References

Citations

See  the  references in Landwasserviadukt (de Wikipedia)

Bibliography

 Talbot, Frederick A. "Railway Wonders of the World." Books on Demand, 2012. .
 Troyano, Leonardo Fernández. "Bridge Engineering: A Global Perspective." Thomas Telford, 2003. .

External links
 
 
 

Viaducts in Switzerland
Rhaetian Railway bridges
Monuments and memorials in Switzerland
World Heritage Sites in Switzerland
Buildings and structures in Graubünden
Bridges completed in 1902
1902 establishments in Switzerland
Bergün Filisur
Schmitten, Graubünden
20th-century architecture in Switzerland